Communication Theory is a quarterly peer-reviewed academic journal publishing research articles, theoretical essays, and reviews on topics of broad theoretical interest from across the range of communication studies. It was established in 1991 and the current editor-in-chief is Thomas Hanitzsch (University of Munich). According to the Journal Citation Reports, the journal has a 2014 impact factor of 1.667, ranking it 13th out of 76 journals in the category "Communication". It is published by Wiley-Blackwell on behalf of the International Communication Association.

Editors 
The following persons have been editor-in-chief of the journal:

References

External links 
 
Former official website

Quarterly journals
English-language journals
Publications established in 1991
Wiley-Blackwell academic journals
Communication journals
1991 establishments in the United States